The 1975–76 season was the 74th season in which Dundee competed at a Scottish national level, playing in the rebranded Scottish Premier Division. In a tight relegation scrap, Dundee were relegated for the first time since the 1937–38 season due to inferior goal average. Domestically, Dundee would also compete in both the Scottish League Cup and the Scottish Cup, where they would be eliminated in the group stage of the League Cup, and by Falkirk in the 3rd round of the Scottish Cup. Dundee would also compete in the Anglo-Scottish Cup, where they would be knocked out by Motherwell in the 1st round of the Scottish Group.

Scottish Premier Division 

Statistics provided by Dee Archive.

League table

Scottish League Cup 

Statistics provided by Dee Archive.

Group 2

Group 2 table

Scottish Cup 

Statistics provided by Dee Archive.

Anglo-Scottish Cup

Player statistics 
Statistics provided by Dee Archive

|}

See also 

 List of Dundee F.C. seasons

References

External links 

 1975-76 Dundee season on Fitbastats

Dundee F.C. seasons
Dundee